KFRN (1280 AM, "Family Radio") is a non-commercial traditional Christian radio station licensed to Long Beach, California and serving the Los Angeles market, which runs programming from Family Radio. Its transmitter is located in Wilmington, California.
The station airs several Christian ministry broadcasts from noted teachers such as RC Sproul, Alistair Begg, Ken Ham, John F. MacArthur, Adriel Sanchez, Dennis Rainey, John Piper, & others as well as traditional and modern hymns & songs by Keith & Kristyn Getty, The Master's Chorale, Fernando Ortega, Chris Rice, Shane & Shane, Sovereign Grace Music, Sara Groves, & multiple other Christian and Gospel music artists.

History
The station first broadcast from the Jergins Trust Building in Long Beach in 1924 as KFON on 1290 kHz. It moved to 1240 kHz in 1927. The 1928 General Order 40 frequency reallocation resulted in a move to 1250 kHz. It moved to its current 1280 kHz frequency as a result of the North American Regional Broadcasting Agreement in 1941.

In 1928 it changed its call letters to KFOX, intending to be acquired by 20th Century Fox. But the deal evaporated, and the partnership of Nichols and Warriner operated the station until the remaining partner, Hal Nichols, died in 1952.

As KFOX, it was one of the first stations in the Los Angeles area to broadcast a country music format, featuring Tennessee Ernie Ford and Cliffie Stone in its early days. Sonderling Broadcasting bought the station from the Nichols estate and adopted a full-time country format. The station moved from its long-time facilities at 220 East Anaheim to the International Tower.

The station, as KFOX, as well as staffers Hal McClain and Jonathan Fricke, were featured in the 1974 H. B. Halicki film Gone in 60 Seconds, both playing themselves.

In 1977 the station was sold to the non-profit Family Stations, Inc., and became KFRN.

References

External links
FCC History Cards for KFRN

FRN
Family Radio stations
FRN
Radio stations established in 1924